The Audi Type A is an automobile which was introduced in 1910. It is considered to be the oldest vehicle under the Audi name. A total of 140 vehicles were produced. In 1911 the type A was succeeded by the Audi Type B.

Specifications

Sources 
 Werner Oswald: Alle Audi Automobile 1910-1980, Motorbuch Verlag Stuttgart, 1. Auflage (1980), 

Type A
Cars introduced in 1910
First car made by manufacturer